Jagannathakam  is a 1991 Telugu-language, drama film, produced by Radha Krishna, Chalapathi Rao under the R. C. Creations banner and directed by A. Mohan Gandhi. It stars Jagapathi Babu, Meena, Sharada  and music composed by Vidyasagar.

Plot
The film begins with a family which lives festively, Balakotaiah and Manikyamma couple having 4 daughters Sarada, Neela, Madhavi, and Jhansi. Jagam is an orphan nurtured by Manikyamma and serves as a valet. From childhood, he loves Neela as Manikyamma betrothed him. Sarada is subjected to domestic violence by her spouse Inspector Krishna Rao and even goes into miscarriage. Thus, as a brash lady Manikyamma gets her back and also sentences her son-in-law. Meanwhile, Neela is ragged by her co-student Chakarvathy as a payback Manikyamma slaps him in front of all. Parallelly, Madhavi loves a cool guy Prabhakar and their elders accept it. As well as Neela's alliance is also fixed with a well-educated guy which is difficult for Jagam. Exploiting it, Chakarvathy arouses Jagam and makes him muddle at the marriage ceremony. Hence, both weddings are called off. After some time, Jagam silently knits Neela in her sleep even Prabhakar also wedlocks Madhavi without his parents' assent. Here, Neela discards Jagam and always humiliates him which he bears with patience. Besides, Chakravarthy intrigues along with his friend Kishore and traps Jhansi. Knowing it, Balakotaiah moves to fix up the alliance together with Jhansi where Kishore tries to molest Jhansi. In that clash, Balakotaiah slaughters Chakravarthy and goes behind bars. At last, Jagam struggles hard along with the family and acquits Balakotaiah. Consequently, Neela understands her husband's virtue. Finally, the movie ends on a happy note.

Cast
Jagapathi Babu as Jagam
Meena as Jhansi
Sharada as Manikyamma
Satyanarayana as Balakotaiah
Anand as Prabhakar
Narra Venkateswara Rao as Parameswara Rao
Chalapathi Rao as Yerra Subbaiah 
Prasad Babu as Krishna Rao
Ravi Shankar as Chakarvathy
Rajeevi as Madhavi
Easwari Rao as Neela
Jayalalitha as Lanka Papa
Varalakshmi as Sarada
Tatineni Rajeswari as Parameswara Rao's wife
Anitha as Krishna's Rao's sister

Soundtrack

Music was composed by Vidyasagar and released by LEO Audio Company. Lyrics were written by Veturi.

References

1991 films
1990s Telugu-language films
Films scored by Vidyasagar
Films directed by A. Mohan Gandhi